Nowe Budy  is a village in the administrative district of Gmina Łanięta, within Kutno County, Łódź Voivodeship, in central Poland. 

References

Villages in Kutno County